Jackson Township is one of twelve townships in White County, Indiana, United States. As of the 2010 census, its population was 655 and it contained 291 housing units.

Jackson Township was established in 1843.

Geography

Cities, towns, villages
 Burnettsville

Adjacent townships
 Cass Township (north)
 Boone Township, Cass County (northeast)
 Jefferson Township, Cass County (east)
 Adams Township, Carroll County (south)
 Lincoln Township (west)

School districts
 Twin Lakes School Corporation

Political districts
 Indiana's 2nd congressional district
 State House District 16
 State Senate District 07

References
 United States Census Bureau 2007 TIGER/Line Shapefiles
 United States Board on Geographic Names (GNIS)
 IndianaMap

External links
 Indiana Township Association
 United Township Association of Indiana

Townships in White County, Indiana
Townships in Indiana